"Skin" is a song by American rock band Breaking Benjamin. It was released in February 2003 as the second single from the band's debut album, Saturate. The song charted on both Billboards Hot Mainstream Rock Tracks and Alternative Songs, peaking at No. 24 and No. 37, respectively.

Background
In an interview with Rock Star Tribune, Ben stated:

The song has been performed twice on live television. The first performance was aired on March 14, 2003 on Last Call with Carson Daly and the second was aired on April 7, 2003 on The Late Late Show with Craig Kilborn.

Track listing

Charts

References

Breaking Benjamin songs
2003 singles
Hollywood Records singles